The Missionaries of St. Francis de Sales (MSFS), also known as the Fransalians, was founded in Annecy, France on 24 October 1838 by Fr. Peter Mermier under the patronage of St. Francis de Sales. The political disturbances in the country, especially the French Revolution had its impact in the spiritual realm too as it left the people in a deep spiritual crisis and indifference towards their religious duties. Sensing the signs of the time Fr. Mermier took upon himself the task of a spiritual renewal in his people by preaching parish missions. This special apostolate in turn gave rise to a community of preachers gathered around Fr. Mermier.

History
It was founded in response to the desire of St. Francis de Sales to found a society of missionary priests. Nearly two centuries after the saint's death, Monsignor Joseph Rey, a successor of the Saint in the See of Annecy, broached the subject of such a society to Father Peter Mermier, who had been considering the same idea. Accordingly, Father Mermier put the design into execution.

In 1830 the institute was formed with La Feuillette as the site for the mother-house. This was solemnly blessed by the bishop on 8 August 1837, and the congregation canonically instituted by him on 8 October 1838. The society was not to be a mere association of priests, but a new religious congregation, bound by simple vows. Hence Father Mermier, the first superior-general, offered himself and his companions to the Pope for foreign missions. In 1845 his offer was accepted by Congregation for the Evangelization of Peoples, and the first missionaries of St. Francis de Sales set out for India.

The work has prospered and since that time more than 100 priests and seminarians have been sent out by the congregation, besides many lay brothers. More than 200 nuns of different orders have gone out at the call of the missionaries to help them. The first batch of the Fransalians (MSFS) landed in Pondichery on 8 September 1845 and the first batch of the Fransalians reached Visakhapatnam  on 19 February 1846. The Congregation for the Evangelization of Peoples entrusted the Vicariate of Visakhapatnam to the Fransalians on 2 May 1848. Until 1888 there was only one region of the Fransalians in India: Visakhapatnam Region. In 1888 Nagpur region was created by bifurcating the Visakhapatnam region. Both were raised to the status of province in 1965. 
 
The dioceses of Nagpur and Visakhapatnam have always been governed by prelates belonging to this institute. In Visakhapatnam the first vicar apostolic was Mgr. Neyret (1850); he was succeeded by Mgr. Tissot, first bishop of the diocese. The first bishop of Nagpur was Mgr. Riccaz; after him came Mgr. Pelvat, a great supporter of the Indian way of religious life and Indian Theology developed by Brahmabandhab Upadyay (1861 -1907), followed by Mgrs. Crochet, Bonaventure, and Coppel.

The Fransalians in France and Switzerland were directly under the Superior General until 1959. It became a region in 1960 and a province in 1965.

The Fransalians went to England in 1861. England became a region of the Fransalians in 1940 and a province in 1965. In England the fathers have three missions in the Diocese of Clifton. Since the persecution of 1903, the congregation has been obliged to leave Savoy for England, where the juvenate, the novitiate, and the house of studies are successfully carried on.

The mission in Brazil was begun in 1926. The Province of Brazil was established in 1965. In 1975 the Fransalians of the Visakhapatnam Province entered the North-East India for evangelization. In 1984 the vice-province of NE India was erected and later in 1990 it was raised to the status of a province.

Following the original vision of the Founder, the Servant of God, Fr. Mermier, the Fransalians entered the African Continent in 1988. The mission began in Tanzania and the Province of East-Africa comprising Tanzania, Kenya and Uganda, was established in 1996.

An autonomous American Mission in the US was founded in 1990 and later raised to the Status of a Region under the Superior General on 3 July 2007.

The South-West India Province was established in 1991 bifurcating the Visakhapatnam Province. The Visakhapatnam Province was further bifurcated to form the Tamil Nadu - Pondichery region under the Visakhapatnam Province on 24 January 2005. Three years later this region was raised to the status of  a Province with a new name, Chennai Province on 24 January 2008 and in the same year on 15 August 2008, it was renamed as South-East Province. The Nagpur Province was established in 1965 and was later renamed Maharashtra-Goa Province. It was bifurcated in 1996 and the present Nagpur and Pune provinces were erected.

The superiors-general since the foundation have been the Very Reverend Fathers Mermier, Gaiddon, Clavel, Tissot, Gojon, and Bouvard.

References

 "Missionaries of St.Francis de Sales: Some Important Dates" in Missionariorum Sancti Franscisci SalesiiStatus 2012
 "Fransalians", Devasia Manalel MSFS in A Concise Encyclopedia of Christianity in India2014, pp. 396 –398
 Duval, Adrien. Monsieur Mermier 1790 - 1862: Founder of Two Religious Congregations, Bangalore: SFS Publications, 1985
 Moget, Francis. Early Days of the Visakhapatnam Mission 1846 - 1920), Bangalore: IIS Publications, 1997
 Kuzhuppil, Devasia, Visakhapatnam Province,Bangalore: SFS Publications, 1990
 Mookenthottam, Antony, 150 Years MSFS on Indian Soil:1845 -1995,Bangalore: SFS Publications, 1996

External links
 

Religious organizations established in 1838
Salesian Order
1838 establishments in France